St. Bassus's Church is a church on Prešeren Square in Koper, a port town in southwestern Slovenia. It has the function of a chapel of the Parish of Koper–Assumption of Mary (the cathedral parish). The building, which dates from the end of the 16th century, at first served as a hospital of St. Nazarius and was consecrated as a church by Koper Bishop Paolo Naldini in 1706. It was significantly rebuilt in 1731. It has a Baroque interior with a single nave and a flat ceiling. The rich Baroque interior furnishings include the main altar with images of St. Nazarius and St. Bassus, a statue of St. Bassus in the vestry, and a Romanesque crucifix from about 1120, later Gothicised, that was believed to have miraculous powers. It is made of polychrome wood and depicts a triumphant Christ.

Roman Catholic churches in the Slovene Littoral
Bassus' Church
16th-century Roman Catholic church buildings
Baroque church buildings in Slovenia
1706 establishments in the Republic of Venice
Roman Catholic churches completed in 1731
18th-century Roman Catholic church buildings in Slovenia